HMS Wellington (launched Devonport, 1934) is a  sloop, formerly of the Royal Navy. During the Second World War, she served as a convoy escort ship in the North Atlantic. She is now moored alongside the Victoria Embankment, at Temple Pier, on the River Thames in London, England, as the headquarters ship of the Honourable Company of Master Mariners, where she is known as HQS Wellington. It was always the ambition of the founding members of the company to have a livery hall. Up to the outbreak of war in 1939, various proposals were examined, including the purchase of a sailing ship, .

After the Second World War, it became apparent that the possibility of building a hall in the City of London had been rendered very remote. In 1947, the Grimsby-class sloop Wellington was made available by the Admiralty. The company decided to buy her with money subscribed by the members and convert her to a floating livery hall, an appropriate home for a company of seafarers.

Since 2014, Wellington has also served as the London postal address of the Flag Institute.

Service history

Royal Navy service

Built at Devonport in 1934, HMS Wellington served in the Pacific mainly on station in New Zealand and China before the Second World War. As built, Wellington mounted two 4.7-inch guns and one 3-inch gun. Additionally, anti-aircraft guns were fitted for self-defence. Depth charges for use against submarines were carried. Wellington served primarily in the North Atlantic on convoy escort duties. She shared in the destruction of one enemy U-boat and was involved in Operation Cycle, the evacuation of Allied troops from Le Havre.

 was moored near Wellington on the Embankment until February 2016.  This ship, built as HMS Saxifrage in 1918, was a  anti-submarine Q-Ship, and is one of the last three surviving warships of the Royal Navy built during the First World War.  President was one of the first types of warship built specifically for anti-submarine warfare.

Post-war

After World War II, she was converted from being His Majesty’s Ship Wellington to Headquarters Ship (HQS) Wellington at Chatham Dockyard. The cost of this conversion was met by an appeal to which Lloyd's, shipping companies, livery companies and other benefactors contributed. It included the installation of a grand wooden staircase taken from the 1906 Isle of Man ferry , which was being broken up at the same time. Wellington arrived at her Victoria Embankment berth in December 1948 to continue service as the floating livery hall of the Honourable Company of Master Mariners.

In 1991, HQS Wellington was dry-docked at Sheerness for three months during which, apart from extensive steelwork repairs and complete external painting, she received a major refurbishment which included the refitting of all toilet facilities, offices and accommodation areas. Wellington was fitted with carpet, and displays were installed of the Company’s marine paintings and artefacts, gold and silver plate, ship models and newly discovered very early 18th-century charts.

See also

References

Bibliography
 

 
 Tramp to Queen autobiography by Capt. John Treasure Jones, The History Press (2008)

External links

 The Honourable Company of Master Mariners
 The Wellington Trust website

 

1934 ships
Grimsby-class sloops
Sloops of the United Kingdom
World War II sloops of the United Kingdom
Ships and vessels of the National Historic Fleet
1948 establishments in England
Museum ships in the United Kingdom
Tourist attractions in the City of Westminster
Buildings and structures on the River Thames
Livery halls
Victoria Embankment